Kristers Aparjods (born 24 February 1998) is a Latvian luger. He started competing in luge in 2006.

Career
He took the gold medal in the singles event in the 2016 Winter Youth Olympics in Lillehammer, Norway, where he was also selected as the flag bearer for the Latvians in the opening ceremony. He was also part of the Latvian team which won the team relay at the 2015 Junior World Championships in Lillehammer, and went on to take a silver in the singles at the 2016 Junior World Championships in Winterberg, Germany, and a gold in the singles on home ice at the 2017 Junior Worlds at Sigulda. He competed at the 2018 Winter Olympics, finishing 11th in the men's singles event and sixth as part of the Latvian team in the team relay.

Personal life
He is the son of luger Aiva Aparjode and the brother of luger Kendija Aparjode.

References

External links

 

1998 births
Living people
Latvian male lugers
Olympic lugers of Latvia
Lugers at the 2018 Winter Olympics
Lugers at the 2022 Winter Olympics
Medalists at the 2022 Winter Olympics
Olympic bronze medalists for Latvia
Olympic medalists in luge
Youth Olympic gold medalists for Latvia
People from Sigulda
Lugers at the 2016 Winter Youth Olympics
21st-century Latvian people